Claude Edward Lamb III (born March 4, 1974) is an American college football coach and former player. In December 2022, he was named as the head football coach at the University of Northern Colorado.  Lamb served as the head football coach at Southern Utah University (SUU) from 2007 to 2015. From 2015 to 2022, he was the assistant head football coach at Brigham Young University (BYU). H Lamb is an alumnus of BYU.

Head coaching record

References

External links
 BYU profile

1974 births
Living people
American football defensive ends
American football linebackers
BYU Cougars football coaches
BYU Cougars football players
Idaho Vandals football coaches
Northern Colorado Bears football coaches
Redlands Bulldogs football coaches
Ricks Vikings football players
San Diego Toreros football coaches
Southern Utah Thunderbirds football coaches
Sportspeople from Castro Valley, California
People from Castro Valley, California